Ann Derwin is Ireland's Ambassador to China with accreditation to Mongolia.

Education 
Originally from Kilmacud, Dublin, Ann Derwin graduated from University College Dublin (UCD) with a bachelor's degree in Veterinary Medicine in 1986. Derwin also holds a Masters in Agricultural Economics from Imperial College, University of London (2005) and a Doctorate in Governance from Queen's University Belfast (2010).

Career 
After graduating from UCD, Derwin worked in mixed veterinary practice in Wales before setting up her own small animal practice in County Sligo. She joined the Irish Department of Agriculture, Food and the Marine as a veterinary inspector in 1992, and worked in County Donegal for six years.

She was appointed Assistant Secretary at the Department in 2016, with responsibility for corporate affairs including HR, finance and the Minister’s Office. Derwin was the first woman to serve on the management board of the Department.

Ann Derwin was the winner of the UCD Alumni Award in Agriculture and Veterinary Science in 2018.

In January 2021, Ann Derwin took up the role of Ambassador of Ireland to the People’s Republic of China with accreditation to Mongolia, having been nominated for this post in July 2020.

See also 

 Thelma Doran

References 

Year of birth missing (living people)
Ambassadors of Ireland to China
Alumni of University College Dublin
People from County Sligo
Irish women ambassadors